A mobile virtual private network (mobile VPN or mVPN)  is a VPN which is capable of persisting during sessions across changes in physical connectivity, point of network attachment, and IP address.  The "mobile" in the name refers to the fact that the VPN can change points of network attachment, not necessarily that the mVPN client is a mobile phone or that it is running on a wireless network.

Mobile VPNs are used in environments where workers need to keep application sessions open at all times, throughout the working day, as they connect via various wireless networks, encounter gaps in coverage, or suspend-and-resume their devices to preserve battery life. A conventional VPN cannot survive such events because the network tunnel is disrupted, causing applications to disconnect, time out, fail, or even the computing device itself to crash. Mobile VPNs are commonly used in public safety, home care, hospital settings, field service management, utilities and other industries. Increasingly, they are being adopted by mobile professionals and white-collar workers.

Comparison with other VPN types
A VPN maintains an authenticated, encrypted tunnel for securely passing data traffic over public networks (typically, the Internet.) Other VPN types are IPsec VPNs, which are useful for point-to-point connections when the network endpoints are known and remain fixed; or SSL VPNs, which provide for access through a Web browser and are commonly used by remote workers.

Makers of mobile VPNs draw a distinction between remote access and mobile environments.  A remote-access user typically establishes a connection from a fixed endpoint, launches applications that connect to corporate resources as needed, and then logs off. In a mobile environment, the endpoint changes constantly (for instance, as users roam between different cellular networks or Wi-Fi access points). A mobile VPN maintains a virtual connection to the application at all times as the endpoint changes, handling the necessary network logins in a manner transparent to the user.

Functions
The following are functions common to mobile VPNs.

Management
Some mobile VPNs offer additional "mobile-aware" management and security functions, giving information technology departments visibility and control over devices that may not be on the corporate premises or that connect through networks outside IT's direct control.

Industries and applications
Mobile VPNs have found uses in a variety of industries, where they give mobile workers access to software applications.

In telecommunications
In telecommunication, a mobile VPN is a solution  that provides data user mobility and ensures secure network access with predictable performance.  Data user mobility is defined as uninterrupted connectivity or the
ability to stay connected and communicate to a possibly remote data network while changing the network access medium or points of attachment.

In 2001, Huawei launched a product named "MVPN".  In this case "MVPN" had a different meaning from the way that later industry sources would use the term.  The Huawei product was focused on delivering a seamless corporate phone system to users whether they were on desktop phones or mobile devices.  Although the web page is no longer available, the company advertised that their MVPN had the following advantages over a standard phone system:
 Direct connectivity – the corporate network becomes part of mobile operator's network through direct connection
 Private numbering plan – the communication is tailored to company organization
 Corporate Business Group – all offices and employees are part of one common group, that includes all mobile and desk phones
 Short dialing – a short number to access each employee, no meter on his mobile or desk phone
 Smart Divert – easy divert within company group
 Groups and subgroups – Several sub-groups could be defined within the group with different changing as well as with separate numbering plan
 Calls control – certain destinations could be allowed or barred both on mobile and desk phones.

Vendors
Bittium
Columbitech
Connectify
Ericsson
NeoAccel
NetMotion Wireless
Radio IP Software
Smith Micro Software
Tmharay

References

External links
 VPN Consortium
 "An Introduction to IPsec VPNs on Mobile Phones" by Ramon Arja, MSDN Magazine, September 2009
 The Different VPN Networks And Their Funcationality
 Search Mobile Computing: mobile VPN
 "Face-off: Mobile VPN is a better choice than an SSL VPN" by Tom Johnaton, Network World (24 November 2006)

GSM standard
Internet privacy
Mobile technology
Network architecture
Virtual private networks